Pseudorca is a genus of cetaceans with three members which include Pseudorca yokoyamai, Pseudorca yuanliensis and Pseudorca crassidens, of which P. crassidens (commonly known as the false killer whale) is the only extant member.

Pseudorca Crassidens travel in pods of 10-20 but may belong to larger schools around 100 and more 

Pseudorca yuanliensis is found in Pliocene layers in Yuanli, Taiwan, while Pseudorca yokoyamai is found in both Pliocene and Pleistocene rocks in Japan.

References

Oceanic dolphins
Cetacean genera
Mammal genera with one living species
Taxa named by Johannes Theodor Reinhardt